Ihor Vasilyovich Prokopchuk (3 March 1968) is a Ukrainian diplomat.

Early life
Ihor Prokopchuk is the younger brother of Russian police major general Alexander Prokopchuk, who serves as Vice President of Interpol.

He graduated from Taras Shevchenko National University of Kyiv in 1992.

Career
He started his diplomatic career in 1992 as an attaché at the Department of Information, Ukrainian Ministry of Foreign Affairs.

From 2008 until 2010 he was Ambassador of Ukraine to Lithuania.

Permanent Representative of Ukraine to the international organizations in Vienna since 2010, he is the head of the Permanent Mission of Ukraine to the OSCE.

References

External links
 Permanent Mission of Ukraine to the International Organizations in Vienna

1968 births
Living people
Taras Shevchenko National University of Kyiv alumni
Ambassadors of Ukraine to Lithuania
People from Korosten
Ambassadors of Ukraine to Romania